Nationalencyklopedin ("The National Encyclopedia" in English), abbreviated NE, is a comprehensive contemporary Swedish-language encyclopedia, initiated by a favourable loan from the Government of Sweden of 17 million Swedish kronor in 1980, which was repaid by December 1990. The printed version consists of 20 volumes with 172,000 articles; the Internet version comprises 260,000 articles (as of June 2005).

History
The project was born in 1980, when a government committee suggested that negotiations be initiated with various publishers. This stage was finished in August 1985, when  in Höganäs became the publisher responsible for the project. The project specifications were for a modern reference work based on a scientific paradigm incorporating gender and environmental issues.

Pre-orders for the work were unprecedented; before the first volume was published in December 1989, 54,000 customers had ordered the encyclopedia. The last volume came out in 1996, with three supplemental volumes in 2000. 160,000 copies had been sold as of 2004.

Associated with the Nationalencyklopedin project are also:
NE:s Ordbok, a dictionary in three volumes (1995–1996)
NE:s Årsband, complementary volumes concerning current events and fast changing information distributed annually since 1997
NE:s Sverigeatlas, an atlas of Sweden (1998)
NE:s Världsatlas, a world atlas (1998)
NE-spelet, a quiz game with 8,000 questions (1999)

In 1997, the first digital form of the encyclopedia was released on six CD-ROMs (later on DVD as well), and in 2000 as an Internet subscription service. The online version contains the dictionary as well as an updated version of the original encyclopedia. It has 356,000 entries, 183,000 of which are encyclopedic articles. The service has been completed with several features not available in the printed version, such as a Swedish–English dictionary.

After a decision to remove the authors' names from the byline of online articles, SVT reported the encyclopedia may be forced to remove thousands of articles due to copyright infringement unless the authors' names are added back.

See also
Nordisk familjebok (1876–1957)
Swedish Wikipedia
List of online encyclopedias

References

External links
Nationalencyklopedin - Official site (in Swedish)
Svenska uppslagsverk - Christofer Psilander's comprehensive bibliography on Swedish encyclopedias

Swedish encyclopedias
National encyclopedias
Swedish online encyclopedias
1989 non-fiction books
20th-century encyclopedias
21st-century encyclopedias